Sikkim Janata Parishad or SJP (Sikkim Popular Association) was a political party in the Indian state of Sikkim led by N.B. Bhandari.

SJP won the state assembly elections 1979, when it got 22,776 votes (31,49%) and won 17 seats (had candidates in 31 out of total of 32). Bhandari became the Chief Minister.

In 1981 SJP merged with Indian National Congress. However, in 1984 Bhandari split from Congress and founded Sikkim Sangram Parishad.

Electoral records 
 Sikkim Legislative Assembly election

 Lok Sabha election, Sikkim

References 

Defunct political parties in Sikkim
Political parties disestablished in 1981
Political parties with year of establishment missing
1981 disestablishments in India